Spotnitz is a surname. Notable people with the surname include:

Frank Spotnitz (born 1960), American television writer and producer
Henry Spotnitz, American cardiac surgeons
Hyman Spotnitz (1908–2008), American psychoanalyst and psychiatrist 
William D. Spotnitz, American cardiothoracic surgeon